The European Magazine (sometimes referred to as European Magazine) was a monthly magazine published in London. Eighty-nine semi-annual volumes were published from 1782 until 1826. It was launched as the European Magazine, and London Review in January 1782, promising to offer "the Literature, History, Politics, Arts, Manners, and Amusements of the Age." It was in direct competition with The Gentleman's Magazine, and in 1826 was absorbed into the Monthly Magazine.

Soon after launching the European Magazine, its founding editor, James Perry, passed proprietorship to the Shakespearean scholar Isaac Reed and his partners John Sewell and Daniel Braithwaite, who guided the magazine during its first two decades.

The articles and other contributions in the magazine appeared over initials or pseudonyms and have largely remained anonymous. Scholars believe that the contributions include the first published poem by William Wordsworth (1787) and the earliest known printing of "O Sanctissima", the popular Sicilian Mariners Hymn (1792).

References

Further reading

Helene E. Roberts's short overview of the European Magazine in Alvin Sullivan, ed., British Literary Magazines: The Augustan Age and the Age of Johnson, 1698–1788 (Westport, Connecticut: Greenwood Press, 1983), pp. 106–112.

External links
The European Magazine, and London Review, vols. 1–86, hathitrust.org

Defunct magazines published in the United Kingdom
Magazines established in 1782
Magazines disestablished in 1826
Monthly magazines published in the United Kingdom
Cultural magazines published in the United Kingdom
Magazines published in London
1782 establishments in England